A hatter is a person engaged in hatmaking.

Hatter(s) may also refer to:

People
 Clyde Hatter (1908–1937), American baseball player
 Hamilton Hatter (1856–1942), African American professor
 Maddelynn Hatter, American drag queen
 Steve Hatter (born 1958), English footballer
 Terry J. Hatter Jr. (born 1933), American judge
 Tony Hatter, British automobile designer
 Hatter, a demonym of residents of Medicine Hat, Canada

Sports
 Danbury Hatters, an American baseball team (1887–1914)
 Madison Hatters, an American baseball team 
 Stetson Hatters, Stetson University's athletics teams
 Luton Town F.C. or the Hatters, an English football team
 Stockport County F.C. or the Hatters, an English football team

Other uses
 Hatter (Alice's Adventures in Wonderland), a character in Lewis Carroll's stories
 Hatter Fox, a character in Marilyn Harris's stories
 Háttér Society, an LGBTQI NGO in Hungary

See also 
 Hattar (disambiguation)
 Mad as a hatter (disambiguation)
 Mad Hatter (disambiguation)